Alexander Tachie-Mensah (born 15 February 1977) is a Ghanaian former professional footballer who played as a forward. After his retirement, he became a coach.

Club career
Tachie-Mensah was born in Accra.

He last played for FC St. Gallen and retired on 9 June 2009.

International career
Tachie-Mensah was a member of the Ghana national team and was called up to the 2006 World Cup.

Coaching career
After his retirement, Tachie-Mensah became the head coach an FC Frauenfeld youth team in August 2009.

He later became assistant coach at fifth-tier side FC Kreuzlingen.

References

External links
 

Living people
1977 births
Footballers from Accra
Association football forwards
Ghanaian footballers
Ghana international footballers
2006 FIFA World Cup players
2002 African Cup of Nations players
Ebusua Dwarfs players
FC St. Gallen players
Neuchâtel Xamax FCS players
Swiss Super League players
Ghanaian expatriate footballers
Ghanaian expatriate sportspeople in Switzerland
Expatriate footballers in Switzerland